Şekibe Gençay Gürün (born 1932) is a Turkish art director, diplomat and politician.

Early years
Gencay Gürün was born to Fahri and his spouse Naime in İstanbul in 1932. She graduated  from Lycée Français Sainte Pulchérie Istanbul, Lycée Notre Dame de Sion Istanbul and the School of Law of Ankara University. She went to England for a Master's degree in International relations and Diplomacy at the London School of Economics. She returned to Turkey and began serving in the Foreign Ministry. She served in the Common Market Department and later was appointed consul in Paris, France. In 1967, she married Kamuran Gürün (1924–2004), an ambassador and abandoned her diplomatic career. Due to her husband's occupation, she stayed in Bucharest, Romania and Athens, Greece.

Theatre
In 1976, the couple returned to Ankara, and in 1979 Gencay Gürün began serving in the Turkish State Theatres as the secretary general and the chief dramaturge. In 1984, she moved to İstanbul to serve as general art director of Istanbul City Theatres. In 1994, she retired from the public service. The next year, Gürün founded her own theatre "Tiyatro İstanbul". In her theatre, she was both a translator and director.

Politics and later
Gürün joined the True Path Party (DYP), and by the 1995 general election held on 24 December, she was elected as a deputy from İzmir Province in the 20th Parliament. However, on 19 October 1996, she  resigned from her political party. Although she briefly joined the Democrat Turkey Party (DTP) on 14 July 1997, she chose to be independent on 12 November 1998. She did not run for a seat in the parliament in the next term.

Her husband died in 2004. She is currently a member of High Commission of the Press Council.

Director
She directed the following plays:
Pierrette Bruno: Le Charimari
Bernard Slade: Same Time, Next Year
Pierre Barillet and Jean-Pierre Gredy: Lily & Lily 
Pierre Barillet and Jean-Pierre Gredy: Peaux de vaches
Oscar Wilde: An Ideal Husband 
Neil Simon: Chapter Two
Neil Simon: The Odd Couple (Female Version)
Jasmina Reza: Art  
A. R. Gurney: Sylvia 
Marc Camoletti: Pyjamas Pour Six
Kressmann Taylor: Address Unknown

Awards
Chevalier des Arts et des Lettres from the French Government
Honorary doctorate from Boğaziçi University
Avni Dilligil The Best Director AwardThe Woman of the Year by the Turkish Women Association Muhsin Ertuğrul Special Prize''

References

Living people
1932 births
Diplomats from Istanbul
Lycée Notre Dame de Sion Istanbul alumni
Ankara University Faculty of Law alumni
Alumni of the London School of Economics
Turkish women civil servants
Turkish civil servants
Turkish women diplomats
20th-century Turkish women politicians
Democrat Party (Turkey, current) politicians
Deputies of Izmir
Members of the 20th Parliament of Turkey
Turkish theatre directors
Turkish translators
Turkish theatre owners
Recipients of the Ordre des Arts et des Lettres
21st-century Turkish women politicians